"Another Lover", sometimes titled "(The World Don't Need) Another Lover", is a 1988 song by English duo Giant Steps, from their debut album The Book of Pride. Written by vocalist Colin Campsie, bassist/keyboardist George McFarlane and record producer Gardner Cole, the song was a top 20 hit single in the United States.

Release and reception
Released in the middle of 1988, "Another Lover" peaked at number 13 on the U.S. Billboard Hot 100 in November. 
In addition, the single peaked at number 13 on the Singles Sales chart, number 12 on the Hot 100 Airplay chart, and number 25 on the Adult Contemporary chart.

Due to the success of "Another Lover" in the U.S., Giant Steps joined a wave of British acts at the time, including Breathe, Scarlett and Black and the Escape Club, who became "American pop stars" before being exported "back for re-release in Britain." 
McFarlane said of the single's UK re-release, "Already, we are noticing a better reaction to the record this time around." He added, "It's getting more air play, and the general vibe is a bit better—all because it was a hit in America." Campsie said "When we started out, this is the sound we went for, we were recording lead vocals, and I was knocking them out in three-quarters of an hour. I'm real proud of that. We try not to be too nit-picky about records. If it's good the first time you sing it, then that's very good. The spontaneity has to be there."

AllMusic writer William Cooper described the song as "a catchy piece of dance/pop fluff." 
The song was featured as the opening track to the 1989 comedy film Loverboy starring Patrick Dempsey.

Track listing
7" Vinyl (UK, U.S., Canada)
 "Another Lover" - 3:40  	
 "Adrenalin" - 4:39

12" Vinyl (U.S., Canada)
 "Another Lover" (12" dance mix) - 7:45  	
 "Another Lover" (7" edit - new bass) - 4:12 	
 "Another Lover" (house dub) - 7:27 	
 "Another Lover" (LP version) - 4:13

Chart performance

References

1988 debut singles
Songs written by Colin Campsie
Songs written by Gardner Cole
1988 songs
A&M Records singles